Orthonevra weemsi, the Weems' mucksucker, is a rare species of syrphid fly.  It has been observed in eastern North America. Hoverflies get their names from the ability to remain nearly motionless while in flight. The adults are also known as flower flies for they are commonly found around and on flowers, from which they get both energy-giving nectar and protein-rich pollen. Larvae for this genus are of the rat-tailed type. O. weemsi  larvae have not been described.

References

Insects described in 1966
Eristalinae